Dahaneh-ye Abshuiyeh (also romanized as Dahaneh-ye Ābshū’īyeh; also known as Dahaneh-ye Ābshūeeyeh) is a village in Hur Rural District, in the Central District of Faryab County, Kerman Province, Iran. At the 2006 census, its population was 286, in 76 families.

References 

Populated places in Faryab County